Our Lady of Perpetual Help Parish is a Roman Catholic parish designated for Polish immigrants in New Bedford, Massachusetts, United States.

Founded in 1905, Our Lady of Perptual Help is one of the Polish-American Roman Catholic parishes in New England in the Diocese of Fall River.  Since the 1930s, the parish has been staffed by the Conventual Franciscans.

Parish has been closed on Jan 20, 2022.

Bibliography 
 
 The Official Catholic Directory in USA

External links 
 Our Lady of Perpetual Help Church
 Our Lady of Perpetual Help Parish - ParishesOnline.com
 Our Lady of Perpetual Help Parish - TheCatholicDirectory.com
 Diocese of Fall River

Polish-American Roman Catholic parishes in Massachusetts
Roman Catholic parishes of Diocese of Fall River
Roman Catholic churches in Massachusetts
Churches in New Bedford, Massachusetts